Stephen is a ghost town in Decatur County, Kansas, United States.

History
Stephen was issued a post office in 1883. The post office was discontinued in 1888.

References

Further reading

External links
 Decatur County maps: Current, Historic, KDOT

Former populated places in Decatur County, Kansas
Former populated places in Kansas